The Midland Metropolitan Statistical Area, as defined by the United States Census Bureau, is an area consisting of one county – Midland – in West Texas, anchored by the city of Midland. As of the 2020 census, the MSA had a population of 169,983.

The Midland Metropolitan Statistical Area is also a component of the Midland–Odessa Combined Statistical Area, which covers two counties (Midland and Ector) and had a population of 335,154 as of 2020.

Counties
Midland

Communities
Greenwood (unincorporated)
City of Midland (Principal City; small portion in Martin County) 
City of Odessa (mostly in Ector County)

See also
Texas census statistical areas

References

Metropolitan areas of Texas